Digimon World 4, known as  in Japan, is an action role-playing video game for the PlayStation 2, GameCube, and Xbox developed by BEC and published by Bandai as part of their Digimon franchise. Unlike previous games in the Digimon World series, it features action-based hack and slash gameplay and supports up to four players. Each player plays as either an Agumon, a Veemon, a Guilmon, and a Dorumon. The game is loosely based on the 2005 Digital Monster X-Evolution film, even using footage from the movie itself. The GameCube version was not released in the PAL Region.

Plot
The game's protagonists are members of the "D.S.G. (Digital Security Guard)". Based on Digital Monster X-Evolution, it is immediately revealed that a computer virus known as the "X-virus" is spreading quickly and is infecting many Digimon. "The Yamato Server" has disappeared, and a new server known as "The Doom Server" has taken its place. They are sent to the first area of the game named Death Valley to search for Chief Leomon. When it is completed the player finds out that The Doom Server may in fact be The Yamato Server. The player is then sent to destroy the "Doom Dome". This is where the first real boss appears, Apocalymon. The player is then sent to Dry Land to stop the X-Virus spreading and must defeat MaloMyotismon. They are then sent to the Venom Jungle to stop the Dread Note from launching and must then defeat Lucemon. They are then sent to the final area of the game Machine Pit to destroy the final boss Mecha Rogue X.

Gameplay

Digimon World 4 is an action role-playing game with elements of digital pet games. The game offers a choice of one of four starter Digimon: Dorumon, Veemon, Guilmon, and Agumon. Depending on what the player does in the game, the Digimon it selects and the level, it may gain a Digivolution. In this game the player does not use the Digimon powers but instead attacks the enemy by using weapons like swords, guns and axes.

Development
Digimon World 4 was developed and published by Digimon series veteran Bandai. The game was first showcased at Electronic Entertainment Expo (E3) 2004 with release planned for the summer. It later enjoyed exhibition at E3 2005, and had gone gold by June 2. Specially marked copies of the game were packaged with a limited-edition Digimon trading card depicting a new Digimon called Dorumon.

Reception

Digimon World 4 has received average to poor reviews from critics. It holds an average of 6.1 on IGN, which states "Digimon World 4 had the makings of a decent action role-playing game. Unfortunately, a myriad of issues bring it down. It has a wholly unsatisfying single-player game, made worse by a clunky camera and overly cheap enemies. It's also unbalanced, leaving players without any compatriots out in the cold. Bring in a few friends and things change drastically." The game was also criticized for its similarities to Final Fantasy Crystal Chronicles, yet "not coming close in terms of narrative, style and game mechanics," and for its drastically different style than the other Digimon World games.

References

External links
Official website 

Role-playing video games
Action role-playing video games
Digimon video games
GameCube games
PlayStation 2 games
Video games developed in Japan
Xbox games
Multiplayer and single-player video games
2005 video games